Kepler-395c is a potentially habitable exoplanet 616 light-years away in the constellation of Cygnus.

Habitability and Properties
It orbits an M-type star. It's radius is 1.32 ± 0.09 times that of Earth. It orbits at 0.177 AU with an orbital period of 34.9893 days. Because of its proximity to its star, it's likely to be tidally locked, meaning one side always facing the star, and one side always facing away. This means one side is blistering hot, and one side is bitter cold. However, in between those hostile zones, there would be a sliver of habitability. If it has a thick enough atmosphere, the sliver may even be global.

See also
 Kepler-186e
 Kepler-186f
 Kepler-438b
 Kepler-442b
 Kepler-296e
 Kepler-62e
 Kepler-69c
 Kepler-395b

References 

 

Exoplanets discovered by the Kepler space telescope
Exoplanets discovered in 2014
Transiting exoplanets

Cygnus (constellation)